La Matilde Formation is a Jurassic geological formation in the Austral Basin of Santa Cruz Province, Patagonia, Argentina. It is dated to the Middle to Late Jurassic. From the Bathonian age (164.7 to 167.7 million years ago) to the Kimmeridgian age (150.8 to 155.7 million years ago) at the latest.

The area was once part of the subtropical and temperate regions of the southern supercontinent Gondwana in the Mesozoic era, a more or less continuous landmass consisting of what is now modern South America, Africa, Antarctica, Australia, New Zealand, and New Guinea.

Description 
La Matilde consists primarily of sedimentary rocks. It includes claystone, coal beds, conglomerates, siltstones, sandstones, and volcanic tuff. La Matilde overlies but sometimes intersperses with the Middle Jurassic Chon Aike Formation. The two formations are the subunits of the Bahía Laura Group.

Fossil content 
La Matilde is known for the abundant fossils recovered from it. Notable fossil localities in the formation include the Cerro Cuadrado Petrified Forest, the Cerro Madre e Hija Petrified Forest, and the remains and trace fossils (including trackways) of dinosaurs in the Laguna Manantiales Farm.

Fossil taxa recovered from the La Matilde Formation include:

Flora

 Agathoxylon matildense
 Araucaria mirabilis
 Araucarites sanctaecrucis
 Brachyphyllum
 Equisetum thermale
Pararaucaria patagonica

Ichnofossils

 Ameghinichnus patagonicus
 Casamiquelichnus navesorum
 Delatorrichnus goyenechei
 Grallator
 Notobatrachus degiustoi
 Sarmientichnus scagliai
 Wildeichnus navesi

See also 
 List of stratigraphic units with theropod tracks
 List of fossil sites

References

Bibliography

Further reading 
 2009 - Una nueva Equisetaceae fértil de la Formación La Matilde, Jurásico Medio, Argentina

Geologic formations of Argentina
Late Jurassic South America
Middle Jurassic South America
Jurassic System of South America
Jurassic Argentina
Bathonian Stage
Kimmeridgian Stage
Shale formations
Sandstone formations
Siltstone formations
Conglomerate formations
Tuff formations
Coal formations
Coal in Argentina
Aeolian deposits
Lacustrine deposits
Ichnofossiliferous formations
Fossiliferous stratigraphic units of South America
Paleontology in Argentina
Geology of Patagonia